KF Kevitan is an Albanian football club based in Tirana. The club was founded on 12 July 2014 and is currently not competing in any football league, after withdrawing from the Albanian Second Division in the 2018–19 season.

History
In the 2014–15 season, the club was won its first ever trophy after defeating FC Internacional Tirana 2–1 in the Albanian Third Division championship final.

Top goalscorers
Competitive, professional matches only. Matches played (including as substitute) appear in brackets.

Managers

Sponsorship

Main sponsor: Kevitan Group Albania
Main sponsor: Kevitan Security & Communications UK
Official shirt manufacturer: Adidas
Official sponsor: Alumil
Official sponsor: FlyTech
Official sponsor: Kevitan Group

Official sponsor: SuperSport News
Official sponsor: Wee Albania
Official sponsor: Flytech
Official sponsor: KrikKrak
Official sponsor: FreeFlow Yoga Tirana
Official sponsor: Pikark.al'

Shirt sponsors and manufacturers

References

Football clubs in Albania
Association football clubs established in 2014
2014 establishments in Albania
Football clubs in Tirana
Albanian Third Division clubs